= 1995 Northern Transvaal Currie Cup season =

Rugby union competition season

1995 Currie Cup
- Countries: South Africa
- Champions: Natal
- Runners-up: Western Province

In 1995 the Northern Transvaal rugby union team competed in South Africa's Currie Cup. They competed against five other teams and did not qualify for the final.

== Northern Transvaal results in the 1995 Currie cup ==
1995 Northern Transvaal results
game №	Northern Transvaal points	Opponent points	Opponent	date	Venue	Currie Cup season	Result	Match notes
1	33	3	Free State	8 July 1995	Loftus Versfeld, Pretoria	1995 Currie Cup	Northern Transvaal won	
2	24	3	Eastern Province	5 August 1995	Port Elizabeth	1995 Currie Cup	Northern Transvaal won	
3	31	13	Western Province	12 August 1995	Ellis Park Stadium, Johannesburg	1995 Currie Cup	Northern Transvaal won	
4	53	21	Free State	26 August 1995	Bloemfontein	1995 Currie Cup	Northern Transvaal won	
5	36	36	Natal	9 September 1995	Loftus Versfeld, Pretoria	1995 Currie Cup	Match drawn	
6	18	12	Transvaal	16 September 1995	Ellispark	1995 Currie Cup	Northern Transvaal won	
7	47	10	Eastern Province	23 September 1995	Loftus Versfeld, Pretoria	1995 Currie Cup	Northern Transvaal won	
8	13	20	Western Province	30 September 1995	Cape Town	1995 Currie Cup	Northern Transvaal lost	
9	13	23	Natal	1995	King's Park, Durban	1995 Currie Cup	Northern Transvaal lost	
10	19	22	Transvaal	1995	Loftus Versfeld, Pretoria	1995 Currie Cup	Northern Transvaal lost	

- Northern Transvaal did not qualify for the 1995 Currie Cup final.

== Statistics ==
=== 1995 Currie cup log position ===
1995 Currie Cup Log
	Team	Played	Won	Drawn	Lost	Points For	Points Against	Points Difference	Tries For	Tries Against	Points
3rd	Northern Transvaal	10	6	1	3	287	163	+124	32	14	13

=== 1988 - 1995 results summary (including play off matches) ===
Period	Games	Won	Drawn	Lost	Win %	Points for	Average PF	Points against	40-49 pts	50-99 pts	100+ pts	Best score	Worst score against
1988–1995	96	66	3	27	68.75%	2629	27.39	1865	7	6	0	71-3 vs South West Africa (1989)	57-13 vs Transvaal (1994)
